Ciarán Collins (born 1977 Cork) is an Irish writer. He won the 2013 Rooney Prize for Irish Literature.

Life
He graduated from University College Cork. He teaches secondary school.

Works
 The Gamal Bloomsbury Circus 2013,   
 Primal 2019

References

External links

Living people
Alumni of University College Cork
1977 births